Kagbeli Island (also Hagbeli Island) is an island in Port Loko District, Northern Province , Sierra Leone. There are four populated settlements on the island: Makose and Makenke on the north coast with Makose and Malai on the south coast.

The island is located where the Rokel River enters the Sierra Leone River estuary.

References

Islands of Sierra Leone